The 2015 Malaysia Masters Grand Prix Gold was the first grand prix gold and grand prix tournament of the 2015 BWF Grand Prix Gold and Grand Prix. The tournament was held at the Stadium Perpaduan in Kuching, Malaysia from 13–18 January 2015 and had a total purse of $120,000.

Men's singles

Seeds

Finals

Top half

Section 1

Section 2

Section 3

Section 4

Bottom half

Section 5

Section 6

Section 7

Section 8

Women's singles

Seeds

Finals

Top half

Section 1

Section 2

Bottom half

Section 3

Section 4

Men's doubles

Seeds

  Danny Bawa Chrisnanta / Chayut Triyachart (first round)
  Vladimir Ivanov / Ivan Sozonov (first round)
  Andrei Adistia / Hendra Aprida Gunawan (first round)
  Wahyu Nayaka / Ade Yusuf (second round)
  Markis Kido / Agripinna Prima Rahmanto Putra (quarter-final)
  Hiroyuki Saeki / Ryota Taohata (second round)
  Liang Jui-wei / Lu Chia-bin (first round)
  Chen Hung-ling / Wang Chi-lin (final)

Finals

Top half

Section 1

Section 2

Bottom half

Section 3

Section 4

Women's doubles

Seeds

  Christinna Pedersen / Kamilla Rytter Juhl (champion)
  Nitya Krishinda Maheswari / Greysia Polii (quarter-final)
  Pia Zebadiah  / Rizki Amelia Pradipta (semi-final)
  Shizuka Matsuo / Mami Naito (quarter-final)
  Shendy Puspa Irawati / Vita Marissa (second round)
  Vivian Hoo Kah Mun / Woon Khe Wei (second round)
  Keshya Nurvita Hanadia / Devi Tika Permatasari (quarter-final)
  Puttita Supajirakul / Sapsiree Taerattanachai (second round)

Finals

Top half

Section 1

Section 2

Bottom half

Section 3

Section 4

Mixed doubles

Seeds

Finals

Top half

Section 1

Section 2

Bottom half

Section 3

Section 4

References

External links
Tournamentsoftware link

Malaysia Masters
Malaysia
Malaysia Masters
Kuching